Tropidophorus thai, commonly known as Thai water skink, or Thai stream skink is a species of skink found in Thailand and Burma.

References

External links
 Flickr photo by Michael Cota, Nan Province, Thailand
 Flickr photo by Michael Cota, Khao Soi Dao Wildlife Sanctuary, Thailand
 Species of Doi Suthep-Pui National Park, Thailand

Tropidophorus
Reptiles of Myanmar
Reptiles of Thailand
Reptiles described in 1919
Taxa named by Malcolm Arthur Smith